In molecular biology, a SANT domain is a protein domain that allows many chromatin remodeling proteins to interact with histones.  The name SANT is an acronym standing for "Swi3, Ada2, N-Cor, and TFIIIB". It is part of the extended SANT/Myb family.

References 

Protein domains